The 38th Massachusetts General Court, consisting of the Massachusetts Senate and the Massachusetts House of Representatives, met in 1817 and 1818 during the governorship of John Brooks. John Phillips served as president of the Senate and Timothy Bigelow served as speaker of the House. On February 10, 1818, the General Court issued the corporate charter for the Suffolk Bank to a group of the Boston Associates (including Patrick Tracy Jackson and Daniel Pinckney Parker).

Senators

Representatives

See also
 15th United States Congress
 List of Massachusetts General Courts

References

External links
 . (Includes data for state senate and house elections in 1817)
 
 

Political history of Massachusetts
Massachusetts legislative sessions
massachusetts
1817 in Massachusetts
massachusetts
1818 in Massachusetts